Furness Glacier is a small glacier flowing between Cape Belsham and Point Wild to the north coast of Elephant Island, South Shetland Islands. It was charted and named by the Ernest Shackleton Endurance expedition 1914–16.

See also
 List of glaciers in the Antarctic
 Glaciology

References

 

Glaciers of Elephant Island